Georg Schumann (28 November 1886 – 11 January 1945) was a German communist and resistance fighter against the Nazi regime.

Life

Imperial Germany 
Schumann's father was a socialist. The skilled toolmaker joined the Social Democratic Party of Germany (SPD) in 1905, and was chosen to be shop steward in Jena in 1907. In 1912, attended the Social Democratic Party School in Jena, where Rosa Luxemburg discovered his journalistic gift. The SPD posted him at the Leipziger Volkszeitung newspaper in 1913 as editor. During World War I, Schumann joined the Gruppe Internationale (see Spartacist League) founded by Luxemburg, Karl Liebknecht and Clara Zetkin and agitated in the Leipziger Arbeiterjugend (Leipzig Working Youth) against the war. In 1916, he was conscripted, and for doing illegal work for the Spartacist League within the army, he was sentenced to hard labour, imprisoned for 12 years but freed by the November revolution.

One of his soldier guards was the later Communist revolutionary Max Hoelz, whom Schumann acquainted with socialism's fundamentals.

Weimar Republic 
In November 1918, Schumann led the Spartacist League in Leipzig and in 1919 was elected Political Leader of the Communist Party of Germany (KPD) Leipzig District, and in 1921 Political Leader of the KPD Halle-Merseburg District and the local Prussian Landtag member. In 1923, the Party Congress chose him for a position in the Party's Central Committee. In the factional struggles after the KPD's so-called "October Defeat" in 1923, Schumann joined the so-called Middle Group. The ultraleftists did not choose him again for the Central Committee position in 1924, and he had to give up the Reichstag mandate that he had won in May 1924. In late 1924, his Landtag mandate expired, and along with it, his immunity. Since he had been a member of the KPD Central Committee, he was persecuted by the police. He emigrated in early 1925 to Moscow. In March 1926, he returned to Germany to become Party leader in Halle-Merseburg once again, but instead he was arrested, and spent almost a year in pre-trial custody. In 1927, he was chosen to be in the Central Committee again, and he became Political Leader in West Saxony (Leipzig), and in 1928, a Member of the Reichstag. In the factional struggles in 1929, he once again sided with the Middle Group, the Conciliator faction. The victorious left wing about Ernst Thälmann therefore removed him from his post as Leader in West Saxony over storms of protest. In late 1929, he submitted to the Thälmann line. In 1930–1933, he was once again a Member of the Reichstag, and busied himself above all with the Communist jobless workers' movement.

Nazi Germany 
Schumann co-founded one of the most active communist resistance groups that known as the Schumann-Engert-Kresse Gruppe, along with Otto Engert and Kurt Kresse.

In the summer of 1944 Schumann and Engert were arrested by the Gestapo and severely tortured during interrogation. Schumann was sentenced to death for "preparation for high treason" and executed in Dresden on January 11, 1945.
After the war, his urn was buried together with those of other leading members of the resistance group in Leipzig's southern cemetery in a prominent position on the central axis of the main path.

His son Horst Schumann was chairman of the FDJ from 1959 to 1967.

Honours 
Since 1945, a main street in Leipzig, the highway leading towards Schkeuditz and Halle, part of Bundesstraße 6 has borne the name Georg-Schumann-Straße. From 1972 until 1991, a barracks of East Germany's National People's Army in Leipzig's Möckern neighbourhood bore the name Georg-Schumann-Kaserne. Also here was a memorial to Schumann, which has since been torn down. In 1976, the DDR issued a 10 Pfennig postage stamp in his honour.

References

External links 
 

1886 births
1945 deaths
Communist Party of Germany politicians
Executed communists in the German Resistance
Politicians from Leipzig
People from the Kingdom of Saxony
People condemned by Nazi courts
Members of the Reichstag of the Weimar Republic
People from Saxony executed by Nazi Germany